Raivo Kotov (born 11 October 1976 in Viljandi) is a notable Estonian architect.

From 1995 to 2000 Raivo Kotov studied in the Department of Architecture and City Planning of the Estonian Academy of Arts.

Raivo Kotov works in the architectural bureau KOKO Arhitektid OÜ.

Notable works by Raivo Kotov are the Expo 2000 Estonian pavilion in Hannover, the apartment building on Vabriku street, the Fahle building and the Metro Plaza office building in the centre of Tallinn. Raivo Kotov is a member of the Union of Estonian Architects.

Works
Estonian Pavilion, EXPO2000 Hannover, 2000 (with Andrus Kõresaar)
City Hotel Burninieks, 2003 (with Üla Koppel, Andrus Kõresaar)
Georg Ots SPA Hotel in Kuressaare, 2004 (with Üla Koppel, Andrus Kõresaar)
Villa in Kuressaare, 2005
Apartment building in Vabriku Street, 2005 (with Tõnis Kimmel)
Fahle House, 2006 (with Andrus Kõresaar)
Arensburg hotel, 2007 (with Margit Aule, Lea Laidra)
Kuldala housing area, 2008 (with Lembit-Kaur Stöör, Margus Maiste, Tõnis Kimmel, Olga Batuhtina, Margit Aule)
Office building in Rotermanni Quarter, 2008 (with Andrus Kõresaar)
Metro Plaza office building, 2008 (with Lembit-Kaur Stöör, Andrus Kõresaar)

Competitions
EXPO 2000, 1999, I prize
Monument of Freedom, 2002, II prize
Arensburg hotel 2005; I prize
Embassy of Estonian Republic in Riga, 2008; purchase
Extension of the Estonian University of Life Sciences, 2008; purchase

See also
List of Estonian architects

References
Union of Estonian Architects, members
Young Architect Award 2008, nominees
Architectural Bureau KOKO Arhitektid OÜ

Estonian architects
1976 births
Living people